Handball Federation of India, Rohtak (Hindi: हैंडबॉल फेडरेशन ऑफ इंडिया, रोहतक) (HFI) is the governing body for handball in India. HFI is registered under the Societies Registration Act, 1860 at Rohtak. HFI is a member of the Asian Handball Federation (AHF) and the International Handball Federation (IHF) since 1974. It is also a member of Commonwealth Handball Association and South Asian Handball Federation. HFI was founded by Jagat Singh Lohan, a Jat from Rohtak (Haryana) who was an alumnus of YMCA College of Physical Education of Madras (now Chennai). He was also the first secretary general of HFI.

Formation

In India, sport of handball and HFI was founded by Jagat Singh Lohan, a Jat from Rohtak (Haryana) who was an alumnus of YMCA College of Physical Education of Madras. He was also the first Secretary general of HFI. Lohan was founder of handball, netball and throwball games in India. His efforts in Germany during the Munich Olympics in 1972 helped in establishing HFI. The founding member states were Andhra Pradesh, Uttar Pradesh, Haryana, Vidharbha and Jammu and Kashmir. The 1st Senior National Handball Championship was held at Sir Chhotu Ram Stadium, Rohtak, in the year 1972. Haryana won the gold medal and Vidharba got the silver medal.

HFI presidents

HFI general secretaries

HFI executive committee
Following is the HFI Executive committee for the term 2022 – 2025.

Head coaches
The following are the head coaches of the Indian national handball teams:

Current title holders

 (Month and year of event)
 TBD = To be decided

Competitions hosted
HFI had hosted following international championships:

Affiliated members

State associations
 Andhra Pradesh Handball Association
 Arunachal Pradesh Handball Association
 Assam Handball Association
 Bihar Handball Association
 Chhattisgarh Handball Association, Bhilai
 Goa Handball Association
 Gujarat Handball Association
 Haryana State Handball Association, Bhiwani 
 Himachal Pradesh Handball Association, Bilaspur 
 Jharkhand State Handball Association, Jamshedpur
 Karnataka Handball Association
 Kerala Handball Association
 Madhya Pradesh Handball Association
 Handball Association of Maharashtra
 Manipur Handball Association
 Meghalaya Handball Association
 Mizoram Handball Association
 Nagaland Handball Association
 Odisha State Handball Association
 Punjab Handball Association
 Rajasthan State Handball Association
 Sikkim Handball Association
 Tamil Nadu Handball Association, Chennai 
 Telangana Handball Association
 Tripura Handball Association
 Uttar Pradesh Handball Association
 Uttaranchal Handball Association
 West Bengal State Handball Association

Union territories associations

 Andaman and Nicobar Islands Handball Association
 Chandigarh Handball Association
 Handball Association of Dadra and Nagar Haveli and Daman and Diu
 Handball Association of Delhi
 Handball Association of Union Territory of Ladakh
 Jammu and Kashmir Handball Association
 Lakshadweep Handball Association
 Pondicherry State Handball Association

Other units

 Association of Indian Universities 
 Central Industrial Security Force 
 Central Reserve Police Force 
 Mumbai Handball Academy 
 National Handball Academy
 Railways Sports Promotion Board 
 Services Sports Control Board
 Sports Authority of India

Sponsors
 Shiv Naresh
 COSCO

External links 
 Official Website

See also
 India men's national handball team
 India women's national handball team
 Indian Premier Handball League

Notes

References

1972 establishments in Haryana
Asian Handball Federation
Handball governing bodies
Handball in India
National members of the International Handball Federation
Organisations based in Lucknow
Handball
Sports organizations established in 1972